This is a list of Canadian films which were released in 2007:

See also
 2007 in Canada
 2007 in Canadian television

External links
Feature Films Released In 2007 With Country of Origin Canada at IMDb
Canada's Top Ten for 2007 (lists of top ten Canadian features and shorts, selected in a process administered by TIFF)
 List of 2007 box office number-one films in Canada

2007
2007 in Canadian cinema
Canada